Hebeloma dunense is a species of agaric  fungus in the family Hymenogastraceae.

References

dunense
Fungi described in 1929
Fungi of Europe